Journal of Emotional and Behavioral Disorders is a peer-reviewed academic journal that publishes papers in the field of Education. The journal's editors are Elizabeth M. Farmer and Thomas W. Farmer (University of Pittsburgh). It has been in publication since 1993 and is currently published by SAGE Publications in association with Hammill Institute on Disabilities.

Scope 
Journal of Emotional and Behavioral Disorders contains interdisciplinary research, practice, and commentary related to individuals with emotional and behavioral disabilities. The journal covers critical and diverse topics such as youth violence, functional assessment and school-wide discipline.

Abstracting and indexing 
Journal of Emotional and Behavioral Disorders is abstracted and indexed in, among other databases, SCOPUS and the Social Sciences Citation Index. According to the Journal Citation Reports, its 2017 impact factor is 1.2, ranking it 19 out of 40 journals in the category ‘Education, Special’.

References

External links 
 
 HI Official website

SAGE Publishing academic journals
English-language journals